Silicon Power Computer & Communications Incorporated, commonly referred to as Silicon Power and as SP, is an international brand and a Taiwan-based manufacturer of flash memory products, including flash memory cards, USB flash drives, portable hard drives, DRAM modules, card readers, solid state drives, USB adapters, and other industrial grade computer products.

Overview 

Silicon Power is headquartered in the Neihu district of Taipei, Taiwan, and was founded in 2003. Silicon Power produces digital memory.

Corporate information 
Silicon Power has offices in Taiwan, Japan, the Netherlands, Balkan, Russia, China, India, the United States, as well as manufacturing facilities in Taiwan and logistics facilities in Taiwan and Netherlands. In 2012, Silicon Power changed status from private to public on the OTC Taiwan Exchange (TWO).

In a 2010 survey by the Common Wealth Magazine, Silicon Power was ranked No.11 in the top 1,000 fastest growing manufacturers in Taiwan and ranked No.1 in the Semiconductor industry.

History 
Silicon Power was founded in the Neihu district of Taipei, Taiwan, in 2003. In 2004–2008, branches were opened in the Netherlands and Japan.

See also 
 List of companies of Taiwan

References

External links 

Computer hardware companies
Companies based in Taipei
Computer companies established in 2003
Computer memory companies
Computer peripheral companies
Computer storage companies
Electronics companies of Taiwan
Taiwanese brands
2003 establishments in Taiwan